Depot Historic District is a national historic district located at Marion, McDowell County, North Carolina. The district encompasses five contributing buildings associated with the Southern Railway depot at Marion.  The buildings date from about 1894 to about 1935.  They are a commercial building (c. 1913), four-story former Buffaloe Building (c. 1908), commercial building (1911), Laughridge Furniture
Company Building (c. 1894), and freight depot (c. 1935).

It was listed on the National Register of Historic Places in 1991.

References

Geography of McDowell County, North Carolina
Historic districts on the National Register of Historic Places in North Carolina
National Register of Historic Places in McDowell County, North Carolina